The Fourth Canadian Ministry was the cabinet chaired by Prime Minister Sir John Abbott.  It governed Canada from 16 June 1891 to 24 November 1892, including only a year and a half in the middle of the 7th Canadian Parliament.  The government was formed by the old Conservative Party of Canada.

Ministries 
Prime Minister
16 June 1891 – 5 December 1892: Sir John Abbott
Minister of Agriculture
16 June 1891 – 5 December 1892: John Carling
Minister of Customs
16 June 1891 – 25 January 1892: Mackenzie Bowell
25 January 1892 – 5 December 1892: Joseph-Adolphe Chapleau
Minister of Finance
16 June 1891 – 5 December 1892: George Eulas Foster
Receiver General of Canada
16 June 1891 – 5 December 1892: The Minister of Finance (Ex officio)
16 June 1891 – 5 December 1892: George Eulas Foster
Superintendent-General of Indian Affairs
16 June 1891 – 5 December 1892: The Minister of the Interior (Ex officio)
16 June 1891 – 17 October 1892: Edgar Dewdney
17 October 1892 – 5 December 1892: Thomas Mayne Daly
Minister of Inland Revenue
16 June 1891 – 5 December 1892: John Costigan
Minister of the Interior
16 June 1891 – 17 October 1892: Edgar Dewdney
17 October 1892 – 5 December 1892: Thomas Mayne Daly
Minister of Justice
16 June 1891 – 5 December 1892: Sir John Sparrow David Thompson
Attorney General of Canada
16 June 1891 – 5 December 1892: The Minister of Justice (Ex officio)
16 June 1891 – 5 December 1892: Sir John Sparrow David Thompson
Leader of the Government in the Senate
16 June 1891 – 5 December 1892: Sir John Abbott
Minister of Marine and Fisheries
16 June 1891 – 5 December 1892: Charles Hibbert Tupper
Minister of Militia and Defence
16 June 1891 – 25 January 1892: Sir Joseph Philippe René Adolphe Caron
25 January 1892 – 5 December 1892: Mackenzie Bowell
Postmaster General
16 June 1891 – 25 January 1892: John Graham Haggart
25 January 1892 – 5 December 1892: Sir Joseph Philippe René Adolphe Caron
President of the Privy Council
16 June 1891 – 5 December 1892: Sir John Abbott
Minister of Public Works
16 June 1891 – 12 August 1891 Sir Hector Louis Langevin
12 August 1891 – 14 August 1891: Vacant
14 August 1891 – 11 January 1892: Frank Smith
11 January 1892 – 5 December 1892 Joseph-Aldric Ouimet
Minister of Railways and Canals
16 June 1891 – 17 June 1891: Vacant (Toussaint Trudeau was acting)
17 June 1891 – 11 January 1892: Mackenzie Bowell (Acting)
11 January 1892 – 5 December 1892: John Graham Haggart
Secretary of State of Canada
16 June 1891 – 25 January 1892: Joseph-Adolphe Chapleau
25 January 1892 – 5 December 1892: James Colebrooke Patterson
Registrar General of Canada
16 June 1891 – 5 December 1892: The Secretary of State of Canada (Ex officio)
16 June 1891 – 25 January 1892: Joseph-Adolphe Chapleau
25 January 1892 – 5 December 1892: James Colebrooke Patterson
Minister without Portfolio
16 June 1891 – 14 August 1891: Frank Smith
11 January 1892 – 5 December 1892: Frank Smith

References

Succession

04
1891 establishments in Canada
1892 disestablishments in Canada
Cabinets established in 1891
Cabinets disestablished in 1892
Ministries of Queen Victoria